Sérgio Duarte Mamberti (22 April 1939 – 3 September 2021) was a Brazilian actor, filmmaker, painter, writer, and politician.

Biography 
Sérgio Mamberti was born in Santos, São Paulo. He was a graduate of the School of Dramatic Arts of São Paulo, and has been a playwright for more than 50 years. He is brother of the actor Cláudio Mamberti.

Affiliated to the Workers' Party (PT), Sérgio occupied, during the Lula and Dilma Governments, several positions within the Brazilian Ministry of Culture:

 Secretary of Music and Performing Arts
 Secretary of Identity and Cultural Diversity
 President of the National Arts Foundation (FUNARTE)
 Secretary of Cultural Policies
Sérgio died on 3 September 2021 due to multiple organ dysfunction syndrome.

Filmography

Movies

Television

Stage plays

References

External links 

 

1939 births
2021 deaths
People from Santos, São Paulo
Brazilian people of Italian descent
Brazilian people of Portuguese descent
Brazilian male television actors
Brazilian male film actors
Brazilian film directors
Male actors from São Paulo (state)
Workers' Party (Brazil) politicians
Recipients of the Order of Cultural Merit (Brazil)
Brazilian LGBT actors
LGBT film directors
Deaths from multiple organ failure